Gaddam Gang is a 2015 Telugu language comedy-drama film directed by debutant Santhosh P. Jayakumar. The film stars Rajasekhar and Sheena in the lead roles with Satyam Rajesh, Achu (in his acting debut) and Deepak in supportive roles. The film is an adaptation of the 2013 Tamil film Soodhu Kavvum.

Cast 
 Rajasekhar as Daasu, the leader of the Gaddam Gang
 Sheena as Shailu, Daasu's imaginary love interest
 Satyam Rajesh as Ramesh, a member of the Gaddam Gang
 Achu as Suresh, a member of the Gaddam Gang
 Deepak as Pandu, a member of the Gaddam Gang
 Noel Sean
 Yog Japee as Gabbar Singh, a police officer
 Naresh as Dharmaraju
 Seetha
 Nagendra Babu as a rowdy director
 Chitram Basha as a police officer
 Giri Babu as a politician
 Saptagiri in a cameo appearance
 Raghu Babu in a cameo appearance
 Mumaith Khan as an item number in "Kasu Cashu Dabbu"

Production 
Rajasekhar expressed interest in remaking the Tamil film Soodhu Kavvum as he felt that the film would suit him. The lead actress was revealed to be  Anjali Lavania of Panjaa fame. However, Lavania was replaced by Sheena Shahabadi, who portrays Rajasekhar's imaginary girlfriend. The film is co-produced by his wife Jeevitha, who previously produced Aptudu (2004). Achu Rajamani, the film's music composer, signed to portray a supporting role in his acting debut. Rajasekhar started smoking for his role in the film. The film was titled Gaddam Gang as the film revolves around a group of people who engage in negative activities and don't shave.

Soundtrack 
The songs were composed by Achu Rajamani. The songs were released on 13 November.

 "My Dear Sweety" - Achu
 "Vastava Vaddantava" - Deva
 "Kasu Cashu Dabbu" - Achu, Monisha
 "Oh Go Nuvvu" - Achu
 "Vedi Indlo" - M. M. Manasi

Reception 
The Times of India gave the film two-and-a-half out of five stars and wrote that "Gaddam Gang turns out to be the kind of film where the characters have more fun than the audience it is made for".

References

External links 
 

2010s Telugu-language films
2015 comedy-drama films
2010s comedy thriller films
2015 films
Indian comedy-drama films
Telugu remakes of Tamil films
Indian comedy thriller films
Indian black comedy films
Films scored by Achu Rajamani
2015 directorial debut films
2015 comedy films